USS Cubera (SS-347), a  submarine, was a ship of the United States Navy named for the cubera, a large fish of the snapper family found in the West Indies.

Cubera (SS-347) was launched 17 June 1945 by Electric Boat Co., Groton, Conn.; sponsored by Mrs. J. Taber; commissioned 19 December 1945 and reported to the Atlantic Fleet.

After shakedown training off New London, Cubera arrived at Key West, Fla., 19 March 1946. She tested sonar equipment, provided services to experimental antisubmarine warfare development projects in the Florida Straits, and joined in fleet exercises until 4 July 1947 when she sailed to Philadelphia Naval Shipyard for an extensive GUPPY II modernization.

Returning to Key West 9 March 1948 Cubera continued to operate locally out of this port, as well as taking part in fleet exercises in the Caribbean and Atlantic until 3 July 1952 when she arrived at Norfolk, her new home port.

Cubera appeared in Ray Harryhausen's It Came from Beneath the Sea (1955), playing an "atomic sub" used to dispatch the film's giant octopus.

Through 1957 Cubera conducted local operations, and participated in fleet exercises in the Caribbean, as well as cruising to Sydney, Nova Scotia, in June 1955. During 1959 and 1960, she was assigned to Task Force Alfa, a force conducting constant experiments to improve antisubmarine warfare techniques. With this group she cruised the western Atlantic from Nova Scotia to Bermuda.

ARV Tiburon (S-12) 

Cubera was decommissioned and sold under the Security Assistance Program to Venezuela 5 January 1972. The Venezuelan Navy renamed her ARV Tiburon (S-12) ("Tiburon" means shark in Spanish). She was subsequently scrapped by Venezuela in 1989.

References

External links 

USS Cubera website

Balao-class submarines
Ships built in Groton, Connecticut
1945 ships
Cold War submarines of the United States
Ships transferred from the United States Navy to the Bolivarian Navy of Venezuela
Balao-class submarines of the Bolivarian Navy of Venezuela